Aureimonas phyllosphaerae is a bacterium from the genus of Aurantimonas which was isolated from the plant Jatropha curcas Linnaeus from an agrotechnology experimental station in Lim Chu Kang in Singapore.

References

External links
Type strain of Aureimonas phyllosphaerae at BacDive -  the Bacterial Diversity Metadatabase

Hyphomicrobiales
Bacteria described in 2013